The 2017 FFAS Senior League is the 37th edition of the FFAS Senior League, the top league of the Football Federation American Samoa. This season was competed by 12 teams and started on 2 September 2017.

The league was won by Pago Youth.

Teams
These are the teams for the 2017 season.
Black Roses
Green Bay
Ilaoa and To'omata
Lion Heart
Pago Youth
PanSa East
Royal Puma
Tafuna Jets
Taputimu Youth
Utulei Youth
Vaiala Tongan
Vaiala Tongan B

Standings

References

FFAS Senior League seasons
Samoa
football